Sant'Anna Arresi (Arresi in the Sardinian language) is a comune (municipality) in the Province of South Sardinia in the Italian region of Sardinia, located about  southwest of Cagliari and about  southeast of Carbonia.

Sant'Anna Arresi borders the  municipalities of Masainas and Teulada.

Main sights

As well as the pines, squat and Phoenician juniper can be found all around. There are also rare kermes oaks, which, in their bushy state, are found only in very few places on the island.

The wetland at the back of the beach is home to numerous species of birds, including cormorants, green cormorants and shags.

Culture
Ai confini tra Sardegna e Jazz is an international music festival. It is held in the first week of August/first week of September.

References

External links

 www.portopino.net
 www.santannarresijazz.it

Cities and towns in Sardinia
1965 establishments in Italy
States and territories established in 1965